Kaviyoor Murali  (20 March 1931 – 20 October 2001) was an Indian dalit activist, writer and Folklore Research Person from Kerala state.

Life
Murali was born on 20 March 1931 in Kaviyoor, Tiruvalla, Pathanamthitta District, Kerala. He was an Ambedkarite activist. Familiar among all Dalit Activists and Folklore Groups. He studied at Kaviyoor N.S.S. English High School, Thiruvananthapuram Intermediate College and Thiruvalla Mar Thoma College.

In 1953, he was a Full Member and a Full Time worker of Communist Party. Participated actively in the strike to avail trade union rights for the State Transport Workers in 1954. Undergone brutal torture by the police, after arrest and imprisonment. Started career as a teacher. Later, retired as a Superintendent in Public Works Department.

Honours
Honoured with the Fellowship of Bharatiya Dalit Sahithya Academy, New Delhi.
An honorary photograph was unveiled in the Kerala Sahithya Akademy Hall in 2003.

Prominent works
1. Vayalchullikal (Field shrubs)- Collection of poems.
2. Darsanam (Vision)- collection of poems.
3. Dalitharkkezhuthiya Suvishesham (Gospel to the Dalits)
4. Purananooru- Oru Padhanam (Purananooru- a study)
5. Dalit Bhasha (Dalit Language)- Study
6. Ayyankalippada (Ayyankali Fighters)- Novel
7. Dalit Sahithyam (Dalit Literature)
8. Dalitbhashalaghunighandu (A dictionary of Dalit Language)- published by DC Books Kottayam
9. Sugandhi- (Novel, unpublished)
10. MunisomKa (Auto-Biography, published by Rainbow Book Publishers, Chengannur)
11. Velutha (Wheatish)- (Poems, unpublished)
12. Njekkuvilakku (Torchlight)- (Essays, Unpublished)

References

1931 births
2001 deaths
Indian communists
Dalit writers
Indian independence activists from Kerala
Dalit activists
20th-century Indian novelists
20th-century Indian politicians
Malayalam poets
Malayalam novelists
20th-century Indian translators
Novelists from Kerala
Indian male poets
Indian male novelists
People from Thiruvalla
Malayalam-language writers
20th-century Indian poets
Activists from Kerala
Poets from Kerala
Writers from Kerala